Welcome To Haiti: Creole 101 is the fifth studio album by Haitian rapper Wyclef Jean, released on October 5, 2004. The album, which was co-produced by Jean and long time collaborator Jerry 'Wonda' Duplessis, combines elements of reggae, kompa, dancehall,
bachata, and world music. The album contains guest appearances from the likes of Sweet Mickey, Foxy Brown, 2Face Idibia and Sound Sultan. The album was inspired by Jean's love for Creole music, and Jean stated that the album was designed to be as "far from Billboard Hot 100-topping music as possible", describing the record as an instant "cult classic".

The album features performances in a number of languages, including English, French, Creole and Latin. Only one single, "President" was released from the album, although in some territories, "Haitian Mafia" acted as a double A-side. "La Bamba" was released as a promotional vinyl single for radio airplay only. Due to the number of French-language tracks, the album's overall tracklisting differed between the US and Europe, with the final four tracks differing between the two territories. The album was released independently on Koch Records.

Track listing

Chart performance

References 

Albums produced by Wyclef Jean
Wyclef Jean albums
2004 albums